The 2001–02 LEN Cup Winners' Cup is the ongoing 28th edition of LEN's second-tier competition for men's water polo clubs.

Qualifying rounds

Qualification round II
23–25 November
Group winners and runners-up teams of each group advance to quarter finals.

Group A
Jadran Herceg Novi has the right to organize the tournament.

Group B
Cannstatt has the right to organize the tournament.

Group C
Barcelona has the right to organize the tournament.

Group D
Dauphins Mouscron has the right to organize the tournament.

Knockout stage

Quarter-finals
The first legs were played on 19 and 20 January, and the second legs were played on 2 and 3 February 2002.

Semi-finals
The first legs were played on 23 and 24 February, and the second legs were played on 9 and 10 March 2002.

Finals
The first legs was played on 24 March, and the second legs was played on 14 April 2002.

See also
2001–02 LEN Champions League
2001–02 LEN Cup

LEN Cup Winners' Cup seasons
Cup Winners' Cup
2001 in water polo
2002 in water polo